is a Japanese television drama series that aired on TBS from 10 April 2005 to 26 June 2005. Hayato Ichihara played the lead role. The first episode received the viewership rating of 17.3%.

Cast
 Hayato Ichihara as Gō Mashiba
 Haruka Ayase as Michiru Mashiba
 Ryunosuke Kamiki as Horo Mashiba
 Rina Matsumoto as Uta Mashiba
 Sachiko Sakurai as Yūko Nagumo
 Kanata Hongō as Shū Nagumo
 Shun Oguri as Junichi Yaguchi
 Naoki Sugiura (special appearance) as Meiji Mashiba

References

External links
  

2005 Japanese television series debuts
2005 Japanese television series endings
2005 in Japanese television
Japanese drama television series
Nichiyō Gekijō
Television shows written by Shinji Nojima